Happy Family: Conditions Apply is a 2023 Indian Hindi language comedy family-based television series for Amazon Prime Video. The series is directed and produced by Jamnadas Majethia and Aatish Kapadia. It casts Ratna Pathak Shah, Raj Babbar, Atul Kulkarni, Ayesha Jhulka and others.

Plot 
Revolving around the lives of four generations of the Dholakias, Happy Family shows how most families are dysfunctional, and are a blend of traditional and modern values. The Dholakias are known for their high-spirited personalities and inimitable idiosyncrasies. These quirks land them in situations that are hilarious and quirky.

Episodes 

The other episodes would be released every Friday until 31 March 2023.

Cast 
 Ratna Pathak Shah as Hemlata Mansukhlal Dholakia
 Raj Babbar as Mansukhlal Dholakia
 Atul Kulkarni as Ramesh Dholakia
 Ayesha Jhulka as Pallavi Dholakia (Pallu)
 Sanah Kapoor as Ayushi Dholakia
 Raunaq Kamdar as Sanjuoy Dholakia (Sanjoy)
 Meenal Sahu as Tisca Dholakia
 Atul Kumar as Suresh Dholakia
 Paresh Ganatra as Dr. Jatin Kumar
 Pranoti Pradhan as Falguni
 Margaret Wanjiku Kariuki as Kwamboka
 Swati Das as Kanakavalli
 Neha Jhulka as Diana
 Waqar Khan as Gregory
 Mahabanoo Mody-Kotwal as Sheela Maasi
 Vinayak Ketkar as Manager of the Hotel

Soundtrack 
The tracks of this series were released on 13 March 2023 by Sony Music and Amazon Prime Video.

Reception
The trailer was launched on 3 March 2023. During the first screening of the series just before the release of it on 9 March 2023, several actors including Pankaj Kapur, Supriya Pathak, Aanjjan Srivastav, Sarita Joshi, Hussain Kuwajerwala and others were present in the screening in Mumbai, who have praised the series as a leading family comedy series that everyone should watch. Archika Khurrana of Times of India gave it 4 stars out of 5 praising the direction, comedy and performance of the ensemble cast. she stated that this series did not a single dull moment.
Nirmal Gayatri of Pinkvilla also gave 4 stars out of 5 praises the Ratna Pathak Shah and in her final conclusion she said "Happy Family: Conditions Apply" is the ideal remedy for your yearning spirit if you want to binge on a weekend show during the workweek.
similarly Kunal Kothari of India Forums also give positive feedback saying that When it comes to presenting witty humour, entertaining situations, and some flawless performances, "Happy Family: Conditions Apply" not only lives up to the history of Hats Off Productions, but also ensures that the principles are upheld without being preachy and instead supports progressivism and realism. News18 gave the series 3.5 out of 5, and said it includes much comedy like Sarabhai vs Sarabhai and Khichdi, which were directed by Jamnadas Majethia and Aatish Kapadia. Happy Family puts an upper-middle-class Gujarati family's lives in focus, all while being relative. Ratna Pathak Shah of India Today rated the series 3.5/5 and wrote "The biggest USP of the show is the writing and the direction. Keeping the scenes as real and relatable as possible, you get drawn into the lives of these characters. Their fights, worries, wins and defeats suddenly seem to be all yours."

Reactions 
While in an interview, Ayesha Jhulka said that she calls herself comical in real life while talking about her character in the show. She also said that this series would reconnect the families together with a comedy. This would be a different kind of family comedy drama. In another one interview, Ratna Pathak Shah said that her character Hemlata is an unusual woman. She’s not nice, she’s not smooth and she has got all kinds of unpleasantness, yet she’s charming. It’s these contrasting character traits that make a comedy. If everyone is alike then there’s no humour. Shah also said that her character Hemlata had been a difficult character to be played in for her because she has done a different role as Maya Sarabhai in Sarabhai vs Sarabhai, which was much contrast to it. Shah also said that she was having enough faith in Majethia and Kapadia after the success of Sarabhai vs Sarabhai.

References

External links 

 Happy Family: Conditions Apply on Amazon Prime Video

See also 
 Sarabhai vs Sarabhai
 Wagle Ki Duniya – Nayi Peedhi Naye Kissey
 Gulabo Sitabo

Indian television series
Amazon Prime Video original programming
Indian comedy television series
2023 Indian television series debuts